The Never Ending Tour is the popular name for Bob Dylan's endless touring schedule since June 7, 1988.

Background
The Never Ending Tour 2001 started in Japan, where Dylan had not performed since 1997. Dylan then toured Australia where he had not played since 1998.

After finishing his Australasian tour Dylan started to tour the United States performing fourteen shows throughout late April and early May. Shortly after completing the spring tour Dylan recorded his 31st studio album Love and Theft. 

Dylan toured Europe in late June and throughout July performing at several music festivals including Roskilde Festival in Denmark. 

Dylan returned to North America to perform concerts in August including several concerts at State Fairs. The United States Summer Tour came to an end on August 25 in Lancaster, California. Dylan returned to touring on October 5 in Spokane, Washington and ended in Boston on November 24. This was Dylan's 23rd performance in Boston.

Tour dates

Festivals and other miscellaneous performances

<small>
This concert was a part of "Center City Fest".
This concert was a part of "Music Midtown 2001".
This concert was a part of "Nashville River Stages 2001".
This concert was a part of "Memphis in May".
This concert was a part of "Roskilde Festival".
This concert was a part of "Montreux Jazz Festival".
This concert was a part of "Liverpool Summer Pops".
This concert was a part of "Smithwicks Source Festival".

<small>
This concert was a part of "Stimmen 2001".
This concert was a part of "Anzio Jazz Festival".
This concert was a part of "Iowa State Fair".
This concert was a part of "Missouri State Fair".
This concert was a part of "Illinois State Fair".
This concert was a part of "Colorado State Fair".
This concert was a part of "Antelope Valley Fair".

Cancellations and rescheduled shows

Box office score data

References

External links

BobLinks – Comprehensive log of concerts and set lists
Bjorner's Still on the Road – Information on recording sessions and performances

Bob Dylan concert tours
2001 concert tours